Tai Ping Estate is a public housing estate in Sheung Shui, New Territories, Hong Kong. It consists of four residential buildings completed in 1989. Some of the flats were sold to tenants through Tenants Purchase Scheme Phase 5 in 2002.

Houses

Demographics
According to the 2016 by-census, Tai Ping Estate had a population of 4,438. The median age was 42.2 and the majority of residents (97.3 per cent) were of Chinese ethnicity. The average household size was 3.3 people. The median monthly household income of all households (i.e. including both economically active and inactive households) was HK$28,800.

Politics
Tai Ping Estate is located in Yu Tai constituency of the North District Council. It is currently represented by Vincent Chan Chi-fung, who was elected in the 2019 elections.

See also

Public housing estates in Sheung Shui

References

Residential buildings completed in 1989
Sheung Shui
Public housing estates in Hong Kong
Tenants Purchase Scheme